Dominic Stricker was the defending champion but chose not to defend his title.

Aleksandar Kovacevic won the title after defeating Wu Yibing 3–6, 7–5, 7–6(7–2) in the final.

Seeds

Draw

Finals

Top half

Bottom half

References

External links
Main draw
Qualifying draw

Cleveland Open - 1